Jüri Engelbrecht (born 1 August 1939) is an Estonian mechanics scientist.

Since 1963, he is teaching at Tallinn University of Technology. From 1994 to 2004, he was President of Estonian Academy of Sciences.

References

Living people
1939 births
Estonian scientists
Place of birth missing (living people)
Academic staff of the Tallinn University of Technology